Martin Hasse may refer to:
 Martin Hasse (rower), German lightweight rower
 Martin Karl Hasse, German university lecturer, composer and music writer

See also
 Martin Haase, German linguistics professor